MS Gripsholm was a combined ocean liner/cruise ship, built in 1957 by Ansaldo Shipyard, Genoa, Italy for the Swedish American Line for use in transatlantic traffic from Gothenburg to New York as well as long-distance cruising.In 1971 she was laid up for 3 months in Göteborg, being converted into a pure cruise ship, thus ending her Transatlantic career.
 
In 1975 she was sold to the Karageorgis Lines, who named her MS Navarino and used her on Mediterranean routes until 1981, when she was damaged in a grounding off Patmos.
After some repair difficulties, in 1984 the vessel became the first ship of the newly formed Regency Cruises, and was named MS Regent Sea. In 1995, Regency went bankrupt, and Regent Sea was auctioned off to United States American Cruise Line, who started on a conversion to a casino ship, but which was never completed due to bankruptcy of the new owner.
In early 2001 the ship was sold for scrap and began a journey under tow to breakers in India. A Swedish plan to turn her into a hotelship in Stockholm ran into resistance from residents, and in the meantime (June) the ship was looted by pirates while at Dakar. On 12 July of the same year, the hulk sank in heavy seas off Algoa Bay in South Africa.

External links
The Great Ocean Liners: Gripsholm (II)
A Tribute to the Swedish American Line: Gripsholm 1957-1975
 Fakta om Fartyg: MS Gripsholm (1957)
 Svenska Amerika Linien

References

Ocean liners
Cruise ships
1957 ships
Ships built by Gio. Ansaldo & C.
Ships built in Genoa
Ships of Swedish American Line